Andijan Region (Uzbek: Andijon viloyati/Андижон вилояти, ئەندىجان ۋىلايەتى) is a region of Uzbekistan, located in the eastern part of the Fergana Valley in far eastern Uzbekistan. It borders with Kyrgyzstan (Jalal-Abad and Osh Regions), Fergana Region and Namangan Region. It covers an area of 4,300 km2. The population is estimated to be around 3,253,528 (2022) thus making Andijan Region the most densely populated region of Uzbekistan.

The name Andijan has originated from the Persian word of  Andakan.
The traditional etymology connects the name with the Turk, ethnonym Gandhi (Gandhi Turks), known from pre-Islamic period.

Andijan Region is divided into 14 administrative districts. The capital is the city of Andijan.
The climate is a typically continental climate with extreme differences between winter and summer temperatures.

Natural resources include deposits of petroleum, natural gas, ozokerite and limestone. As with other regions of Uzbekistan, it is famous for its very sweet melons and watermelons, but cultivation of crops can be accomplished exclusively on irrigated lands. Main agriculture includes cotton, cereal, viticulture, cattle raising and vegetable gardening.

Industry includes metal processing, chemical industry, light industry, food processing. The first automobile assembly plant in Central Asia was opened in Asaka in Andijan Region by the Uzbek-Korean joint venture, UzDaewoo, which produces Nexia and Tico cars and the Damas minibus.

Administrative divisions

The Andijan Region consists of 14 districts (listed below) and two district-level cities: Andijan and Xonobod.

There are 11 cities (Andijan, Xonobod, Jalaquduq, Poytugʻ, Qoʻrgʻontepa, Qorasuv, Asaka, Marhamat, Shahrixon, Paxtaobod, Xoʻjaobod) and 79 urban-type settlements in the Andijan Region.

References

 
Regions of Uzbekistan